is a Japanese professional boxer who challenged for the IBF and IBO light-welterweight titles in 2016. At regional level he held the WBC-OPBF light-welterweight title from 2014 to 2015 and the WBO Asia Pacific welterweight title twice between 2017 and 2018.

Professional career

Early career 
Obara made his professional debut on 9 August 2010, losing via fifth-round technical knockout (TKO) in a six-round bout against Kazuyoshi Kumano at the Korakuen Hall in Tokyo, Japan.

After compiling a record of 7–1 (6 KOs) he defeated Hayato Hokazono via fourth-round knockout (KO), capturing the vacant Japanese light-welterweight title on 8 April 2013 at the Korakuen Hall. He went on to successfully defend the title twice that year – a third-round KO against So Takenaka in August and a ninth-round TKO against Tetsuya Hasunuma in December – before defeating Jay Solmiano on 14 April 2014 at the Korakuen Hall, capturing the vacant WBC-OPBF light-welterweight title via fourth-round KO.

He successfully defended the title twice along with two victories in non-title fights, winning all by stoppage, before making his American debut against Walter Castillo on 7 November 2015 at Miccosukee Resort & Gaming in Miami, Florida. The bout served as an IBF light-welterweight title eliminator, with the winner being in line to face newly crowned IBF champion Eduard Troyanovsky. In what some described as a controversial decision, the contest ended in a majority draw, with one judge scoring the bout 115–113 in favour of Obara while the other two scored it even at 114–114.

World title challenge 
Following the draw with Castillo, the IBF ordered an immediate rematch to determine Troyanovsky's mandatory challenger. The IBF set a purse bid for Obara and Castillo to take place on 29 December, with the bid being postponed as both sides were close to agreeing a deal. After Castillo eventually refused the rematch, Obara defeated Sin Maneesri with a first-round TKO in a stay-busy fight in April 2016 before facing Troyanovsky as the IBF mandatory challenger. The bout took place on 9 September 2016 at the Soviet Wings Sport Palace in Moscow, Russia, with Troyanovsky's lightly regarded IBO light-welterweight title also on the line. In a short but action packed contest, Obara staggered the champion in the first round with a right hand but was unable to capitalise and score a knockdown. Troyanovsky attacked with more intensity in the second, landing a right hand to stagger Obara. The champion followed up with a flurry of punches, pinning Obara against the ropes before knocking him down with a right hand, sending Obara through the ropes and onto the judges' table. Obara managed to get back into the ring, only to be met by a sustained attack from the champion, prompting referee Michael Ortega to step in and call off the bout, awarding Troyanovsky a second-round TKO victory. The loss would be the second of Obara's career, and the first since losing his professional debut six years prior.

Move to welterweight 
Following the loss to Troyanovsky, Obara moved up to welterweight. His first fight at the weight was an eight-round UD victory against Larry Siwu in April 2017. In his next fight he defeated Narong Bunchan, capturing the vacant WBO Asia Pacific welterweight title by second-round TKO on 10 August 2017 at the Korakuen Hall. He defended the title with a fifth-round KO against Shusaku Fujinaka in December before facing Alvin Lagumbay on 12 April 2018 at the Korakuen Hall. In a rare occurrence, a double knockdown was scored in the second round after both fighters landed hard left hooks at the same time. Lagumbay rose to his feet appearing unhurt while Obara struggled to stand. Eventually making it to his feet on unsteady legs, the referee decided to wave off the fight, awarding Lagumbay the WBO Asia Pacific title via second round TKO and handing Obara the third defeat of his career. The loss was considered an upset as Lagumbay had moved up multiple weight classes for the fight while Obara was ranked No. 6 by the WBO and No. 8 by the IBF. An immediate rematch was made, taking place at the same venue on 9 August 2018. Obara would get his revenge, regaining the title with a third-round TKO.

His next fight was a final eliminator for the IBF welterweight title, with the winner becoming the mandatory challenger to Errol Spence Jr. The bout took place on 30 March 2019 at the 2300 Arena in Philadelphia, Pennsylvania. Suffering the fourth defeat of his career, Obara lost by UD over twelve rounds, with the judges' scorecards reading 118–110, 117–111 and 115–113.

He bounced back from defeat with stoppage wins against Yosmar Kefi in June and Toshiro Tarumi in October, before defeating Yuki Nagano on 1 February 2020 at the Korakuen Hall to capture the Japanese welterweight title.

Obara made his first Japanese welterweight title defense against Shoki Sakai on 8 April 2021. He won the fight by unanimous decision, with all three judges scoring the fight 96–94 in his favor. Obara was booked to make his second title defense against Masaya Tamayama on 9 December 2021. He won the fight by a fifth-round technical knockout, stopping Tamayama with a right uppercut at the 2:44 minute mark of the round. Obara is scheduled to make his third title defense against Yuki Nagano on 12 April 2022. The bout will be a rematch of their February 2020 meeting, which Obara won by a seventh-round stoppage.

Professional boxing record

References

Living people
1986 births
Japanese male boxers
Sportspeople from Iwate Prefecture
Light-welterweight boxers
Welterweight boxers